Chaimite is a village sacred to the Nguni people of the Gaza Empire, currently in Gaza Province, Mozambique. On this site on 28 December 1895, Gungunhana, the last emperor of Gaza, was imprisoned by the Portuguese Empire.  

Gaza Empire
Populated places in Gaza Province